F. G. Clark Activity Center is a 7,500-seat multi-purpose arena in Baton Rouge, Louisiana, that opened in 1975. It is home to two Southern University basketball teams, the Southern Jaguars and Southern Lady Jaguars. The arena also holds concerts and other events.

The arena is named for Dr. Felton Grandison Clark, who was the second president of Southern University after it had been designated as a land-grant college, serving from 1938 to 1969.

See also
 List of NCAA Division I basketball arenas
 List of music venues

References

College basketball venues in the United States
Basketball venues in Baton Rouge, Louisiana
Indoor arenas in Baton Rouge, Louisiana
Sports venues in Louisiana
Music venues in Louisiana
Southern Jaguars basketball
Southern Lady Jaguars basketball
1975 establishments in Louisiana
Sports venues completed in 1975